Harenc is an English language surname occurring especially in the 19th century and which today can be considered as defunct. People with the name include:

 Archibald Harenc (1821–1884), English cricketer
 Charles Harenc (1811–1877), English cricketer
 Edward Harenc (1814–1853), English clergyman and cricketer

References

English-language surnames
Occupational surnames